Richard Bennett Brewer, Jr. (born April 19, 1956) is an American academic administrator currently serving as the ninth president of the Southern Baptist-affiliated Louisiana Christian University.

Career 
Dr. Rick Brewer is the president and chief executive officer of Louisiana Christian University with 36 years of experience in Christian higher education administration.

Since Dr. Brewer’s arrival in March 2015, Louisiana Christian University has advanced from one to four graduate programs, added the CS Lewis Honors Program, established academic partnerships with LaTech and Community Technical Colleges statewide, additional scholarship programs, increased donor base, implemented flat-rate tuition, addressed over $30M deferred maintenance and campus refurbishment while adding over $5M new technology, lights, cameras, classroom equipment, exceeded enrollment of 300 new students for the third time in LCU’s history, and moved from .5 Gig to 2 Gigs Wi-Fi campus-wide.  Under Dr. Brewer’s leadership, the University has raised over $37M from 2805 donors since 2015.

A visionary and results-driven leader, Dr. Brewer and the Presidential Leadership Team’s commitment to academic excellence yielded zero findings of non-compliance for the University’s 10-year reaffirmation by the Southern Association of Colleges and Schools Commission on Colleges in 2021.

Personal life
An accomplished musician, Dr. Brewer has recorded three CD’s called “Psalms, Hymns & Spiritual Songs I & II and “Christmas,” which often provides the content for his concerts in local churches and other venues.

Dr. Brewer and his wife, Cathy, of 45 years are members of Calvary Baptist Church in Alexandria.  They have two sons and three grandchildren.

References

 

1956 births
Living people
People from New Orleans
People from Forsyth County, North Carolina
People from Putnam County, Georgia
People from Summerville, South Carolina
People from North Charleston, South Carolina
People from Charleston, South Carolina
People from Pineville, Louisiana
Educators from Louisiana
Presidents of Louisiana Christian University
Charleston Southern University alumni
University of South Carolina alumni
Harvard Graduate School of Education alumni
Duke University alumni
Baptists from Louisiana
Louisiana Republicans
People from Ladson, South Carolina
Baptists from North Carolina